Sanger–Harris (or, Sanger Harris as it later appeared) was a department store chain from 1961 to 1987.  It was formed by Federated Department Stores in 1961 from two Dallas chains, Sanger Brothers and A. Harris and Co., that dated from the 19th century. The firm merged with the chain Foley's in 1987.

History
 
Sanger–Harris of Dallas, Texas, was the result of the 1961 merger of then four-unit Sanger Brothers Dry Goods Company of Dallas, founded in 1868 by the five Sanger brothers and acquired by Federated Department Stores in 1951; and the two-unit A. Harris and Company of Dallas, founded in 1887 and acquired by Federated in 1961.

In 1965 the company built a new downtown Dallas store to replace the flagship stores of the two companies and, so the business legend goes, turned down the opportunity to move into a new shopping center called NorthPark Center.  During the late 1970s, the chain dropped the hyphen between 'Sanger' and 'Harris' (rumored as a way to differentiate from hometown rival Neiman-Marcus), and continued as an upper-moderate shopping destination. In January 1987 it was merged into the Foley's division; the combined division was sold to The May Department Store Company the next year. Most locations are now Macy's since 2006 when Federated Stores bought out The May Department Stores Company in 2005.

Architecture
Sanger–Harris stores are known for their column and mosaic architecture. The first building to feature the white columns and mosaic is the Downtown Dallas store. The Sanger–Harris branch stores that were built after 1965 all feature this design. The mosaic is now hidden on the Sanger–Harris Building in Downtown Dallas but the white columns are still visible and the building is still a Downtown Dallas landmark. Most of the former Sanger–Harris branch stores still feature this design today.

Locations

Early stores in operation by 1961

Stores operating by 1987

In popular culture 
 In early episodes of Dallas, the downtown Dallas store was used for filming in two different storylines:
 When a lowly young woman agrees to give up her baby to Sue Ellen (played by Linda Gray), Sue Ellen visits a department store to shop for baby clothes and related items. Pam (Victoria Principal) sees Sue Ellen and wonders why she is there.  Sue Ellen tries to pass it off as getting baby items to give to charity. Later Sue Ellen can be seen walking in front of the downtown Dallas store, with bags in her hand clearly displaying the Sanger Harris logo and design. Then, she goes to drop off the bags with the mother and finds J.R. (Larry Hagman) there instead.
 Pam decides she wants to work outside the home, visits "the store" for a job interview with her friend Liz Craig (Barbara Babcock); the downtown Dallas store facade can clearly be seen as Pam approaches the front door of the store. After Pam snags the job, later views of the downtown Dallas store's side entrance on Akard St. can be seen used to introduce scenes of Pam at work.
 In the 1986 movie True Stories, a fashion show takes place at the mall in Virgil, Texas. As the scene is about to begin, the camera pans by a mall's exterior. A Sanger–Harris store building can be seen, among others. This exterior actually belonged to Big Town Mall in Mesquite.
 During Dallas showings of The Rocky Horror Picture Show, audience members would sing the Sanger–Harris jingle "You can always tell a Sanger Harris man". This was done when Dr. Frank-N-Furter came down the elevator in heels and fishnet stockings.
 Prank call comedian Lucius Tate often pretended to be a collection agent from Sanger–Harris when calling his victims.

See also 
 Levy's
 Neiman Marcus
 Sanger, Texas
 Titche's
 List of defunct department stores of the United States

Bibliography

References

External links 
 Sanger–Harris Archive at the Dallas Public Library 
 The Department Store Museum: Sanger–Harris

Archived TV ads
 "You can always tell a Sanger Harris man", 1977
 "Billy the Kid boy's slacks", 1981
 "Super Saver Home Sale", undated

Defunct department stores based in Texas
Companies based in Dallas
Retail companies disestablished in 1987
Defunct companies based in Texas
Retail companies established in 1961
1961 establishments in Texas